Kushk Rural District is a rural district (dehestan) in Abezhdan District, Andika County, Khuzestan Province, Iran. At the 2006 census, its population was 8,479, in 1,554 families.  The rural district has 57 villages.

References 

Rural Districts of Khuzestan Province
Andika County